In probability theory, the Borel–Kolmogorov paradox (sometimes known as Borel's paradox) is a paradox  relating to conditional probability with respect to an event of probability zero (also known as a null set). It is named after Émile Borel and Andrey Kolmogorov.

A great circle puzzle 
Suppose that a random variable has a uniform distribution on a unit sphere. What is its conditional distribution on a great circle? Because of the symmetry of the sphere, one might expect that the distribution is uniform and independent of the choice of coordinates. However, two analyses give contradictory results. Then we can look at two different great circles:
 If the coordinates are chosen so that the great circle is an equator (latitude ), the conditional density for a longitude  defined on the interval  is 

One distribution is uniform on the circle, the other is not. Yet both seem to be referring to the same great circle in different coordinate systems.

Explanation and implications 
In case (1) above, the conditional probability that the longitude λ lies in a set E given that φ = 0 can be written P(λ ∈ E | φ = 0). Elementary probability theory suggests this can be computed as P(λ ∈ E and φ = 0)/P(φ = 0), but that expression is not well-defined since P(φ = 0) = 0.  Measure theory provides a way to define a conditional probability, using the family of events Rab = {φ : a < φ < b} which are horizontal rings consisting of all points with latitude between a and b.

The resolution of the paradox is to notice that in case (2), P(φ ∈ F | λ = 0) is defined using the events Lab = {λ : a < λ < b}, which are lunes (vertical wedges), consisting of all points whose longitude varies between a and b.  So although P(λ ∈ E | φ = 0) and P(φ ∈ F | λ = 0) each provide a probability distribution on a great circle, one of them is defined using rings, and the other using lunes.  Thus it is not surprising after all that P(λ ∈ E | φ = 0) and P(φ ∈ F | λ = 0) have different distributions.

Mathematical explication

Measure theoretic perspective 

To understand the problem we need to recognize that a distribution on a continuous random variable is described by a density f only with respect to some measure μ. Both are important for the full description of the probability distribution. Or, equivalently, we need to fully define the space on which we want to define f.

Let Φ and Λ denote two random variables taking values in Ω1 =  respectively Ω2 = [−, ]. An event {Φ = φ, Λ = λ} gives a point on the sphere S(r) with radius r. We define the coordinate transform

for which we obtain the volume element

Furthermore, if either φ or λ is fixed, we get the volume elements

Let

If we assume that the density  is uniform, then

Hence,  has a uniform density with respect to  but not with respect to the Lebesgue measure.

Proof of contradiction 
 

Consider a random vector  that is uniformly distributed on the unit sphere .

We begin by parametrizing the sphere with the usual spherical polar coordinates:

We can define random variables ,  as the values of 
under the inverse of this parametrization, or more formally using the arctan2 function:

Using the formulas for the surface area spherical cap and the spherical wedge, the surface of a spherical cap wedge is given by

Since  is uniformly distributed, the probability is proportional to the surface area, giving the joint cumulative distribution function

The joint probability density function is then given by

For simplicity, we won't calculate the full conditional distribution on a great circle, only the probability that the random vector lies in the first octant. That is to say, we will attempt to calculate the conditional probability  with

We attempt to evaluate the conditional probability as a limit of conditioning on the events

Now we repeat the process with a different parametrization of the sphere:

This is equivalent to the previous parametrization rotated by 90 degrees around the y axis.

Define new random variables

.

Attempting again to evaluate the conditional probability as a limit of conditioning on the events

Using L'Hôpital's rule and differentiation under the integral sign:

This shows that the conditional density cannot be treated as conditioning on an event of probability zero, as explained in Conditional probability#Conditioning on an event of probability zero.

References

Citations

Sources 

 
 Fragmentary Edition (1994) (pp. 1514–1517)   (PostScript format)
 
 Translation: 
 
 Mosegaard, K., & Tarantola, A. (2002). 16 Probabilistic approach to inverse problems. International Geophysics, 81, 237–265.

Probability theory paradoxes